Newcastle East was an electoral district of the Legislative Assembly in the Australian state of New South Wales. It was created in 1894, when multi-member districts were abolished, and the three member district of Newcastle was divided between Newcastle East, Newcastle West, Kahibah, Waratah and Wickham. from 1894 to 1904, when it was abolished as a result of the 1903 New South Wales referendum, which required the number of members of the Legislative Assembly to be reduced from 125 to 90. Newcastle East was absorbed into the district of Newcastle.

Members for Newcastle East

Election results

References

Former electoral districts of New South Wales
1894 establishments in Australia
Constituencies established in 1894
1904 disestablishments in Australia
Constituencies disestablished in 1904